Presidential elections were held in Egypt on 13 October 1981 following the assassination of President Anwar Sadat on 6 October. The vote took the form of a referendum on Mubarak's candidacy, with 98.5% of voters voting in favour. Voter turnout was reported to be 81.1%.

Results

References

Egypt
Preisdent
Egypt
Presidential elections in Egypt
Referendums in Egypt
Single-candidate elections